Lefini River is a river of the Republic of Congo and a tributary of the Congo River.  Henry Morton Stanley reached the confluence on 9 March 1877.

References

Rivers of the Republic of the Congo